Christine Abrahams Gallery, first named Axiom, was a Melbourne gallery showing contemporary Australian art between 1980 and 2008.

Foundation
Christine Abrahams (5 March 1939 – 15 September 1994) graduated with a Bachelor of Arts from Melbourne University in 1961 majoring in Fine Art. She was a guide at the National Gallery of Victoria for several years, then assisted Patrick McCaughey with research at 'Monash University, and was a gallery director and major supporter of contemporary Australian art in Melbourne from the 1970s, after her marriage to husband Daryl (born 1935), with whom she had three sons Guy, Damian and Ari.

Artist Lenton Parr said of Christine that she valued art "as a gift to the spirit and a source of pleasure and enlightenment," while then director of the National Gallery of Australia, Betty Churcher valued her generosity and enthusiasm, saying she "provided Melbourne with a space and an intellectual climate for some of the most interesting contemporary art from both Australia and overseas."

Abrahams was Manager of Powell Street Gallery between 1976 and 1980 (the lessees were Melbourne solicitor Harry Curtis and a Caulfield doctor, David Rosenthal).

Axiom 
Until 1982, Abrahams was co-director of Axiom Gallery, established in March 1980 at the address of the future Christine Abrahams Gallery, 27 Gipps Street Richmond, an inner, once-industrial, suburb of Melbourne. In the same precinct an increasing number of other commercial galleries, including the long-running Pinacotheca, Niagara Galleries, Stuart Gerstman, and Church Street Centre for Photography appeared.

Of Axiom, critic and artist Robert Rooney remarked; 

Axiom's opening show consisted of large abstract paintings by Sydney Ball, Fred Cress, John Walker and John Firth-Smith, selling at between $700 to $9500, and was followed by a solo of works by photographer David Moore. By 1982, when the gallery was renamed, Abrahams in an interview proudly detailed its record in supporting women artists;

Axiom exhibitions; 
 1980, July: Barbara Zerbini
 1980, July/Aug: Victor Majzner
 1980, September: Helen Geier
 1980, December: Group exhibition: Lesley Dumbrell, Roger Kemp, Sandra Leveson, Victor Majzner, Fred Williams and photographs by David Moore and Max Dupain
1981, February, 7-20: Polly Courtin (painting), Tim Bass (drawing), Nanette Carter (photographs), Tom Psomatragos (photographs)
 1981, 7–19 March: William Kelly drawings
 1981, April: Gisèle Freund photographs
 1981, May: Kevin Connor
 1981, June: Roy Churcher
 1981, June: Michaela Brysha Hair Curler Series
1981, July: Hector Gilliland drawings, Harold Cazneaux photographs
1981, July-18 August: John Walker
 1981, August: The Figure in Drawing and Painting: John Brack, William Frater, Gil Jamieson, Jon Molvig, Merv Moriarty, Peter Powditch, Tony Underhill. Works on Paper, Jeremy Barrett
 1981, September: Three American Painters: Alan Cote, Ray Parker, Harvey Quaytman
 1981, September-22 October: Fred Cress
 1981, November: Lenton Parr
 1981, to 12 November: Pamela Wragg
 1981, to 11 December: Adrian Kerfoot
 1982, 13 February – 3 March: Simon Blau, Peter Brooks, David Hawkes, Peter Jones, Barbara Neil, Susan Norrie, with Julie Patey charcoal drawings.
 1982, to 25 March: Robert Owen
 1982, to 22 April: Victor Majzner
 1982, to 25 June: Enzo Cucchi, Mimmo Paladino, Francesco Clemente, Nicola de Maria, Sandro Chia
 1982, 26 June – 15 July: Marion Borgelt paintings, Tony Woods, drawings
 1982, to 9 December: Lesley Dumbrell paintings and watercolours, Sue Ford Photo Book Of Women: 1961- 1982, traveling show from the Art Gallery of New South Wales
 1982, to end December: ceramic sculptures by James Draper, and One Year Hence, jewellery by former students of RMIT and their lecturer, Robert Baines
In summing up the year 1980, critic Brigid Cole-Adams described Axiom as a "good more conventional gallery with interesting contemporary work including both abstract and new realist styles."

Renamed Christine Abrahams Gallery
In December 1982 Axiom gallery closed, and with Abrahams as director, was eponymously renamed the 'Christine Abrahams Gallery', reopening on 12 February 1983. It showed a broad spectrum of visual arts by contemporary, including photography,  by architects, and craftspeople and indigenous artists, including jewellers, ceramicists and furniture makers. Stuart Gerstman Gallery opened next door at number 29 in April 1983. In 1987 Christine's son Guy Abrahams joined her as co-director of the gallery.

The building had been converted in 1980 from a clothing factory by the architect of Abrahams' own 1982 Brighton residence, Daryl Jackson, who designed Abrahams own house in Beaumaris, preserved the industrial aesthetic of exposed trusses, bare concrete floors and steel roller-door. Jackson himself exhibited at the gallery in April 1984, showing drawings and models for a 'more humane' neo-industrial style. Critic Robert Rooney described the renovation as "spacious and well-planned, and an ideal setting for...large paintings." The configuration of the gallery with a smaller space to the left of the main gallery allowed for shows of smaller 'works on paper' (usually drawings, photographs, or prints) simultaneously with shows usually of larger paintings or sculpture. The gallery was recommended in 1994 as a favourite by Susan Fereday, then director of the Centre for Contemporary Photography and Merryn Gates director of the Ian Potter Museum of Art, University of Melbourne.

Exhibitions under the name 'Christine Abrahams Gallery' 
 1983, February: Eight artists, including Ann Weir and Daniel Kogan
 1983, to 24 March: Fiona Orr, sculpture (main gallery) and Wendy Stavrianos prints (side gallery)
 1983, to 15 April: Genny Haasz, drawings and monoprints.
 1983, 20 April to 12 May: Stephen Spurrier paintings, and Sandringham Series by Craig Gough
 1983, to 2 June: Ann Thomson, collages and painting
 1983, to 6 July: Fred Cress, paintings and Marcus Shanahan, sculpture
 1983, to 4 August: Sydney Ball paintings and drawings
 1983, to 15 October: Loretta Quinn sculpture, Adrian Kerfoot painting
 1983, to 26 October: Judy Silver, Paperworks and Constructions
 1983, to 17 November: Elizabeth Gower paintings, and John Firth-Smith lithographs
 1983, 22 November to 8 December: Clive Murray-White, John Ballany and Terry Setch
 1983, to 24 December: Furniture by Dael Evans, Jane Joyce, Roger Wood and Randall Marsh
 1984, to 12 April: Daryl Jackson, architectural drawings and John Gollings photographs of Jackson's architecture
 1984, to 31 May: Akio Makigawa sculpture and Carlier Makigawa small jewellery/sculpture works
 1984, 5 June to 25 June: Marion Borgelt paintings, Tom Fantl The Prague Suite
 1984, from 14 July: Le Corbusier, etchings
 1984, to 30 August: Victor Majzner, Daniel Kogan
 1984, 5 September to 5 October: Bulun Bulun, bark paintings
 1984, to 1 November: Lesley Dumbrell, paintings
 1984, to 22 November: New Sculptors, New Sculpture, Loretta Quinn, Bruce Armstrong, Peter D. Cole, Ray Woolard, Lyn Plummer, Fiona Orr, Lenton Parr, Clive Murray-White, Hilary Mais
 1984, to 20 December: Self-serve. Supermarket Style Fashion Fashion Design Council of Australia exhibition/sale of fashion
 1984, to 27 December: Works on Paper group show
 1985, February: Grant Mudford, photography
 1985, March: prints by Barbie Kjar, paintings by Denise Green
 1985, May: Helen Geier, paintings
 1988, 26 September – 13 October: Mark Strizic, Melbourne 1954 – 1964
 1989, May: Wild Beast, Michael Kemp; paintings by Helena Kazepis
 1988, to 3 November: Maria Kuczynska, sculpture
1994 24 February: Italian Journey by Alexandra Copeland; David McLeod, paintings
1994 to 24 March: Sculpture by Antonio Colangelo, and Maria Kuczynska
1994, to 21 April: Fred Cress
1994, 25 April–19 May: Paintings and etchings by Voula Therios; Recent work by Stephen Birch
 1994, to 16 June: Grass fibre weavings from Ramingining and Back to the Future, photographs by Jeff Carter
1994, to 14 July: paintings by Mandy Martin; Scenes of the Passion, photographs by Maria Grande
 1994, 16 July–11 August: prints by Barbie Kjar, paintings by Denise Green
1994, 15 August – 8 September: Paintings and works on paper by Aida Tomescu
1994, 15 September–6 October: Michael Johnson
1994, October: Travelling East: photographs of Asia by Richard l'anson
1994, November: Fiona Murphy, ceramics
1994, 5–23 December: Second Hand, works by Miyuki Nakahara; Wall mounted works in glass by Warren Langley
 1995, 14–31 August:  Melbourne in the '60s – an exhibition of photographs by Mark Strizic
 1997, to 20 March: Marion Borgelt
 2000, to October 12: Mandy Martin, Salvator Rosa Series III

Closure 
After Christine's premature death at age 55 from cancer on 15 September 1994, the gallery was operated by her son Guy Abrahams, who had been co-director since 1987.

The gallery was closed after 28 years in November 2008. The Gallery archive was donated to the State Library of Victoria.

Influence
Christine initiated the influential Australian Contemporary Art Fair (now Melbourne Art Fair) and was a member of its organising committee in 1988, 1990 and 1992. She was on the board of the Fifth Australian Sculpture Triennial (1993) and was a member of the Visual Art Export Group of the Australia Council and the Craft Council of Victoria.

References

Art museums and galleries in Melbourne
Art galleries established in 1983
1983 establishments in Australia